The following is a non-exhaustive list of private housing estates in Sha Tin District, Hong Kong.

Tai Wai

Festival City
Festival City is the largest private housing estate in Tai Wai. It is a HK$20 billion residential-commercial development project by Cheung Kong and MTR Corporation. It is located above the Tai Wai (Station) Maintenance Centre, next to Tai Wai station, which is the interchange station between the East Rail line and the Tuen Ma line of the MTR metro system. The site was formerly occupied by a football court and public bicycle park. However the government needed to build the Ma On Shan Line Depot in 2000, forcing the demolition of all of the facilities.

Festival City was built in three phases from 2007 to 2012. It consists of 12 buildings, a  clubhouse and a landscape podium. Phase I was completed in September 2010, Phase II in October 2011, and Phase III in August 2012. It offers 4,264 flats to families, two schools and one community facility. This residential project raised the population of Tai Wai significantly. The controversy of this project is that the 12 towers would create an urban heat island effect and block off the air flow of the area.

Man Lai Court
Man Lai Court is a private housing estate in Tai Wai, near the waterfront of Shing Mun River and Tai Wai station, which is the interchange station between the East Rail line and Tuen Ma line of the MTR metro system. Formerly the Tai Wai Staff Quarters of the Kowloon-Canton Railway Corporation, it consists of 4 buildings developed in 1990 and 1993 respectively by Cheung Kong Holdings.

Sha Tin

City One

City One is the largest private residential estate in Sha Tin District. There are a total of 52 blocks of residential buildings. Each tower is about 30 storeys with units ranging from 389 square feet (36.7 square metres) to an area of 1,018 square feet (94.6 square metres) with different floor plans.

Lucky Plaza
Lucky Plaza consists of 8 high-rise buildings and a shopping centre developed by Chinachem Group in 1983.

Sha Tin Centre

Sha Tin Centre comprises 8 high-rise buildings and a shopping arcade, developed by Henderson Land Development in 1981.

Wai Wah Centre
Wai Wah Centre comprises 4 high-rise buildings and a shopping arcade completed in 1986, developed by Cheung Kong Holdings.

New Town Plaza III 
New Town Plaza III consists of 5 high-rise buildings and a shopping mall developed by Sung Hung Kai Properties in 1990.

Sha Tin Plaza

Sha Tin Plaza comprises 4 high-rise buildings and a shopping arcade, developed by Henderson Land Development in 1988.

Garden Rivera
Garden Rivera

Belair Gardens

Belair Gardens is a private housing estate located at 52 Tai Chung Kiu Road, Sha Tin. It stands on the banks of the Shing Mun River, next to Yuen Chau Kok. There is also a shopping mall, bowling centre, and a car park. It has 14 blocks, each block beginning with a different letter of the alphabet:

Castello

Castello, in Siu Lek Yuen, was developed by Sun Hung Kai Properties and designed by D. Heung & Associates. The design of the development is influenced by European castles, hence the name Castello and the iconic castellation as an architectural feature at the top of the towers and the podium. Construction work finished in December 1999. It consists of eight residential blocks with 32 floors. The tower blocks are built on top of four levels of podium which contain residential car parks and clubhouse facilities. Each block has eight flats on each floor, except Block 5 with seven flats. Flat efficiency rate is at 83%. The smallest flats provide two bedrooms, while the biggest have three bedrooms, including one en-suite and an extra store room with toilet facilities accessed through the kitchen.

The estate is managed by Kai Shing Management Services Limited, a subsidiary company of the developer. The management fee for each flat is HKD1.39 per square foot per month. The management of the estate is also monitored and supervised by a Residents' Committee elected by residents.

Fo Tan

Jubilee Garden

The Palazzo

The Palazzo is a private housing estate in Fo Tan, located near Fo Tan station and right next to Sha Tin Racecourse. It comprises 10 high-rise buildings, offering a total of 1,375 units. Formerly Ho Tung Lau, it was developed by Sino Land and MTR Corporation in 2009.

Royal Ascot

Ma On Shan

Villa Athena
Villa Athena is a private housing estate in Ma On Shan. It is located at 600 Sai Sha Road, five minutes walk from the Ma On Shan station and bus interchange, and shopping centres. It was completed in 1994. It consists of 10 residential towers of 27 storeys. Each storey has four flats, two of 1,068 sq.ft., and two of 901 sq.ft. The top floor of each tower has larger flats (1,848 sq.ft.). In total, the private housing estate contains 1,180 flats.

The estate was built by Sun Hung Kai Properties. Villa Athena has a free residential bus service to Sunshine City and Sha Tin. All rooms in the larger flats have sea view. Villa Athena has the highest gross size to net size ratio in Ma On Shan, at 81.5% (compared to 80.5% for Vista Paradiso (see below), 77.5% for Monte Vista, 76% for Sunshine City and 74.5% for Bayshore Tower).

Vista Paradiso
Vista Paradiso is private housing estate in Ma On Shan. It is situated next to the Heng On station on the MTR Tuen Ma line.

Vista Paradiso was completed in 1998. It consists of 11 residential towers, with number of floors ranging from 29 to 37. In total, the private housing estate contains 2,032 flats. Buyers showed renewed interest in Vista Paradiso in 2006 due to its proximity to newly opened international schools.

Monte Vista
Monte Vista is private housing estate in Ma On Shan. It is situated at 9 Sha On Street and is right next to the Wu Kai Sha station on the MTR Tuen Ma line.

The estates were built by Hutchison Whampoa, together with Bayshore Tower, as part of a triple development project in Ma On Shan.

Monte Vista was completed in 2000, and consists of 12 residential towers. Each tower has 37 floors. In total, the private housing estate contains 1,606 flats. 100 units were sold in the first day of public sales in April 2000, the second-highest first-day sales figure for a property development so far that year after The Waterfront. In two days in July, 108 units were sold; 3-bedroom units were especially popular among property buyers. Transaction prices were in the range of HK$3,200 to HK$3,600 per square foot. By the following year, three dual-level penthouse suites remained unsold, and were being offered by the developer at an average price of HK$4,718 per square foot.

Lake Silver

Another project adjacent to Monte Vista developed by Sino Land is Lake Silver, formerly Lake W, comprises 7 residential blocks with a total of 2,189 units completed in 2009.

Baycrest
Baycrest is an estate comprising six residential blocks, providing 618 flats, near Heng On station.

Double Cove

Double Cove is a large private housing estate in Wu Kai Sha, near Wu Kai Sha station and Whitehead camp. When fully completed, it will comprise 21 housing blocks offering 3,500 flats. The developers are Henderson Land and New World Development.

The housing blocks are arranged around a large clubhouse and a two-storey shopping arcade called Double Cove Place. A walkway, open 24-hours, runs the length of the site connecting to the MTR station and the public transport interchange.

See also
 Private housing estates in Hong Kong

References

Sha Tin District